Love That Jill is an American situation comedy that aired on ABC during the 1957-1958 television season. The series stars Anne Jeffreys and Robert Sterling as the heads of rival modeling agencies in Manhattan.

Synopsis
Jill Johnson and Jack Gibson are the heads of rival New York City modeling agencies in Manhattan. Jack is romantically attracted to Jill, but each of them constantly tries to take clients and models away from the other. Richard is Jill′s secretary, Pearl is Jack′s secretary, Ginger is one of Jill's models, and Melody and Peaches are among the other models at their agencies.

Cast
 Anne Jeffreys...Jill Johnson
 Robert Sterling...Jack Gibson
 James Lydon...Richard
 Betty Lynn...Pearl
 Polly Rose...Myrtle
 Barbara Nichols...Ginger
 Nancy Hadley...Melody
 Kay Elhardt...Peaches

Production
Hal Roach Studios produced Love That Jill. Alex Gottlieb served as producer for the series. Anne Jeffreys and Robert Sterling were married in real life.

Broadcast history

Love That Jill premiered on ABC on January 20, 1958. It lasted only 13 episodes, the last of which aired on April 14, 1958. It was broadcast at 8:00 p.m. Eastern Time on Mondays throughout its run.

Episodes

Sources

References

External links
  
 Love That Jill opening credits on YouTube
 Love That Jill closing credits on YouTube

1950s American sitcoms
1958 American television series debuts
1958 American television series endings
Black-and-white American television shows
NBC original programming
Television shows set in New York City
English-language television shows